Walter Russell Rea, 1st Baron Rea (18 May 1873 – 26 May 1948), was a British merchant banker and Liberal politician.

Rea was the son of Russell Rea. He was elected to the House of Commons for Scarborough in 1906, a seat he held until 1918, and served under H. H. Asquith as a Junior Lord of the Treasury from 1915 to 1916.

He later represented Bradford North between 1923 and 1924 and Dewsbury between 1931 and 1935. From 1931 to 1932 he held office in the National Government of Ramsay MacDonald as Comptroller of the Household. Rea was created a Baronet, of Eskdale in the County of Cumberland, in 1935 and in 1937 he was raised to the peerage as Baron Rea, of Eskdale in the County of Cumberland.

Lord Rea married, firstly, Evelyn, daughter of J. J. Muirhead, in 1896. After her death in 1930 he married, secondly, Jemima, daughter of Reverend Alexander Ewing, in 1931. He died in May 1948, aged 75, and was succeeded in his titles by his eldest son from his first marriage, Philip, who became Liberal leader in the House of Lords. His daughter Elisabeth, also from his first marriage, was married to the industrialist Sir Michael Clapham. Lady Rea died in 1964.

References

 UK General Elections since 1832
 
 

Kidd, Charles, Williamson, David (editors). Debrett's Peerage and Baronetage (1990 edition). New York: St Martin's Press, 1990.

External links 
 
 

1873 births
1948 deaths
Rea, Walter
Rea, Walter
Rea, Walter
Rea, Walter
Rea, Walter
Rea, Walter
UK MPs who were granted peerages
Politicians from Yorkshire
Barons created by George VI